Findelbach is a railway station on the Gornergrat railway, which links the resort of Zermatt with the summit of the Gornergrat.

A freight station is situated at the end of a short branch line from Findelbach.

Gallery

See also
 List of highest railway stations in Switzerland

External links

References

Railway stations in the canton of Valais
Gornergrat Railway stations